The Piora Oscillation was an abrupt cold and wet period in the climate history of the Holocene Epoch; it is roughly dated to c. 3900-3000 BC. Some researchers associate the Piora Oscillation with the end of the Atlantic climate regime, and the start of the Sub-Boreal, in the Blytt–Sernander sequence of Holocene climates.

The spatial extent of the change is unclear; it does not show up as a major, or even identifiable, event in hemispheric temperature reconstructions.

First detection
The phenomenon is named after the Val Piora or Piora Valley in Switzerland, where it was first detected; some of the most dramatic evidence of the Piora Oscillation comes from the region of the Alps. Glaciers advanced in the Alps, apparently for the first time since the Holocene climatic optimum; the Alpine tree line dropped by 100 meters. In the Middle East, the surface of the Dead Sea rose nearly 100 meters (300 feet), then receded to a more usual level. A few commentators have associated the climate changes of this period with the end of the Uruk period, as a Dark Age associated with the floods of the Gilgamesh epic and Noah's flood of the Book of Genesis.

Link to horse domestication
The Piora Oscillation has also been linked to the domestication of the horse. In Central Asia, a colder climate favored the use of horses: "The horse, since it was so adept at foraging with snow on the ground, tended to replace cattle and sheep." The Piora period seems associated with a period of colder drier air over the Western and Eastern Mediterranean, and may have depressed rainfalls as far afield as the Middle East. It is also associated with a sudden onset of drier weather in the central Sahara.

Causes
The cause or causes of the Piora Oscillation are debated. A Greenland ice core, GISP2, shows a sulfate spike and methane trough c. 3250 BCE, suggesting an unusual occurrence — either a volcanic eruption or a meteor or an asteroid impact event. Other authorities associate the Piora Oscillation with other comparable events, like the 8.2 kiloyear event, that recur in climate history, as part of a larger 1500-year climate cycle.

See also
Bond event
4.2-kiloyear event
Bølling–Allerød warming
African humid period
Older Peron
African humid period

Notes

References

4th millennium BC
History of climate variability and change
Historical eras
Uruk period